Zachary Charles Monroe (born July 8, 1931) is an American former professional baseball pitcher who appeared in parts of two seasons in Major League Baseball (–) with the New York Yankees, and was a member of their 1958 World Series champions. The native of Peoria, Illinois, is an alumnus of Bradley University.

Monroe's career began in 1952 and, interrupted by military service, lasted for nine seasons over 11 years. In June 1958, after he posted a 10–2 record for the Triple-A Denver Bears, he was called up to the Yankees and debuted on the 27th with 3 hitless innings of relief against the Kansas City Athletics. He went on to work 20 more games for the 1958 Bombers, making six starts and registering a complete game victory on September 2 against the Boston Red Sox at Yankee Stadium. In the 1958 World Series that followed, Monroe appeared in Game 2 in a "mop-up" assignment; coming into the contest in the home half of the eighth inning with the Milwaukee Braves already ahead 10–2, he allowed three runs and three hits. Milwaukee went on to win 13–5 to take a two games to none led in the Series, but the Yankees battled back to win four of the next five contests and their 18th world title.

Monroe made the 1959 Yankees' 28-man roster coming out of spring training, but hurled in only three games, all in relief, and was sent to Triple-A at the May cutdown. He did not get another opportunity to pitch in the majors, remaining in the minor leagues through 1962. During his MLB career, Monroe compiled a 4–2 record with one save, one complete game, a 3.38 earned run average, and 19 strikeouts in 24 appearances; in 61 innings pitched, he permitted 60 hits and 29 bases on balls.

References

External links

1931 births
Living people
Baseball players from Illinois
Binghamton Triplets players
Bradley Braves baseball players
Denver Bears players
Havana Sugar Kings players
Jersey City Jerseys players
Major League Baseball pitchers
New York Yankees players
Quincy Gems players
Richmond Virginians (minor league) players
San Diego Padres (minor league) players
Sportspeople from Peoria, Illinois
American expatriate baseball players in Cuba